Anza is a town and municipality in Antioquia Department, Colombia.

Municipalities of Antioquia Department